André Rivet (Andreas Rivetus) (August 1572 – 7 January 1651) was a French Huguenot theologian.

Life
Rivet was born at Saint-Maixent, 43 km (27 mi) southwest of Poitiers, France. After completing his education at Berne, he studied theology privately at Berne and La Rochelle, and from 1595 to 1620 was at Thouars, first as chaplain of the duke of La Trémouille and later as pastor. In 1617 he was elected president of the Synod at Vitré; and in 1620 he was called to Leiden as professor of theology.

In 1632 Stadholder Frederick Henry appointed Rivet tutor of his son, later William II, while the university made him honorary professor. In 1641 he attended the prince on his visit to England. In 1645 he exchanged letters with the Irish writer Dorothy Durie concerning the roles for women in the church.

In 1646 was appointed as the first Rector of the new Orange College of Breda, where he passed the remainder of his life and died. Archibald Alexander devotes a chapter of his Thoughts on Religious Experience to Rivet's "death-bed exercises".

Works

A learned Reformed theologian (or, less accurately, a Calvinist) and a relentless apologist of the Reformed faith against the attacks of the Roman Catholic Church, Rivet was in his day the most influential member of the theological faculty of Leyden; and together with his colleagues he drew up, in 1625, the Synopsis purioris theologiae, a series of 52 academic disputations covering the main topics of Reformed theology. At Leyden Rivet also worked in the field of Old Testament exegesis.

His numerous writings are divided among polemics, exegesis, dogmatics, and edification. They were collected in three volumes (Rotterdam, 1651–53), one of the most notable being the Isagoge ad scripturam sacram Veteris et Novi Testamenti (Dort, 1616).

Other works:

 Le Resveille-matin des ministres, response aux demandes de J. Christi, chanoine théologal de Nantes,1600
 Eschantillons des principaux paradoxes de la Papauté, 1603
 Défense de la liberté chrestienne en l’usage sobre des viandes, contre la doctrine de la papauté maintenue par Georges l'Apostre, en son traité du Quaresme, 1605
 Démonstration de la vanité des causes et raisons par lesquelles Olivier Enguerrand, autrefois cordelier, depuis ministre en l'Eglise réformée de Chef-Boulonne et maintenant apostat, prétend colorer sa perfidie ; pour response à la déclaration qu'il a naguères publiée, Saumur, 1607
 Le catholique orthodoxe opposé au catholique papiste, Saumur, 1616 (compilation of Sommaire et abrégé des controverses de nostre temps touchant la religion (1608) and Triomphe de la vérité, en suite du Sommaire des controverses (1610))
 La Défense des deux épistres et de la préface du livre de Ph. De Mornay intitulé: Le Mystère d'iniquité, 1612 
 Critici sacri specimen, hoc est censurae doctorum tam ex orthodocis quam ex pontificis in scripta quae Patribus plerisque priscorum et pluriorum saeculorum vel affinxit incogitantia, vel supposuit impostura, accedunt prolegomena de patrum authoritate, errorum causis et nothorum notis, 1612
 Remarques et considérations sur la Response de Coëffeteau au Mystère d'iniquité (1615-1617)
 Oratio de bono pacis et concordiae in Eecclesia, 1620
 Meditationes XII in selecta aliquot Scripturae loca, 1622
 Statera quâ ponderatur Mantissae Laurentii Foreri jesuitae OEnipontani, Sectio una quam emisit adversus libellum cui titulus est Mysteria Patrum jesuitarum (under the name of Renatus Verdœus), 1627 
 Lettres escrites à Madame de la Trémoille sur le changement de religion de M. le duc de la Trémoille, 1629
 Disputationes XIII de justâ et gratiosâ Dei dispensatione circa salutem generis humani, 1631
 Commentarius in Jonam ; Praelectiones in cap. XX Exodi, 1632 
 Oratio habito in auditorio solemni, 1632
 Exhortations de repentance et recognoissance, faites au sujet du siège de Maëstricht, 1632
 Theologicae et scolasticae exercitationes CXC in Genesim, 1633
 De origine Sabbathi, 1633
 Meditationes in VII psalmos poenitentiales, 1634
 Commentarii in librum secundum Mosis, qui exodus apud Graecos inscribitur, 1634
 Instruction préparatoire à la saincte cène; avec cinq prédications convenables en la matière, Leyde, 1634
 Jesuita vapulans, 1635
 Divers traités de piété sur quelques occasions du temps présent, 1637 
 Méditation sur le Psaume XCI, pour servir d’antidote contre la peste et de précaution contre tous les dangers; avec une lettre sur la question s’il est loisible de s’éloigner des lieux infectés, 1638
 Suspiria poenitensis afflicti, 1638
 Apologia pro sanctissimâ Virgine Mariâ, 1639
 Les derniers vœux du Sacrificateur éternel, compris en sa prière contenue au XVIIe chapitre de saint Jehan, exposée en XVIII sermons, et une paraphrase; avec quelques autres petits traités, 1639 
 Instruction chrestienne touchant les spectacles publics des comoedies et tragoedies, 1639
 Response à trois lettres du Sieur de la Milletière sur les moyens de réunion en la religion; avec la défense de Rivet contre les calomnies du Sr de la Milletière en son Catholique réformé, 1642
 Instruction du prince chrestien, 1642
 Animadversiones in Higonis Grotii annotata in Cassandri consultationem, 1642
 Examen animadversionum Grotii pro sui notis ad consultationem Cassandri, 1642
 Apologeticus pro suo de verae et sincerae pacis ecclesiae proposito, contra Grotii votum, 1643
 Decretum synodi Carentone habitae anno 1644, 1644
 Commentarius in Paslmorum propheticorum de mysteriis evangelicis dodecadem selectam, 1645
 Grotianae discussionis διάλυσις, 1646
 Apologia pro Hieronymi sententiâ de episcopis et presbyteris, 1646
 Question scélèbre s’il est nécessaire ou non que les filles soient sçavantes, Paris, 1646
 Epistolae apologeticae ad criminationes Amyraldi de gratiâ universali, 1648 (co-written with his brother Guillaume Rivet)
 Sur le chapitre XII de l’Epitre aux Romains, 1648
 Synopsis doctrinae de naturâ et gratiâ, excerpta ex Amyraldi tractatude predestinatione, 1649
 Lupi servati presbytari, viri doctissimi, qui ante annos 800, in Galliâ vixit de tribus questionnibus, 1650 (under the name of Renatus de Viraeus)
 La bonne vieillesse, représentée en une lettre latine d’A. Rivet à G. Rivet, son frère, et par lui traduite en français, 1652

References

Johannes Meursius, Athenae Batavae., pp. 315 sqq., Leyden, 1625; 
Les Dernières Heures de M. Rivet, Delft, 1651, English translation The Last Houers of ... Andrew Rivet, The Hague, 1652; 
B. Glasius, Godgeleerd Nederland, iii. 180-186, 's Hertogenbosch, 1851–56; 
E. and E. Haag, La France protestante, ed. H. L. Bordier, viii. 444-449, Paris, 1877 sqq.; 
Lichtenberger, ESR, mi. 238-241.

External links
 

Schaff-Herzog article

1572 births
1651 deaths
French Calvinist and Reformed theologians
Academic staff of Leiden University
Huguenots
People from Sarthe
17th-century Calvinist and Reformed theologians
17th-century French writers
17th-century French male writers
17th-century French theologians